Chun Lee-kyung (Hangul: 전이경, Hanja: 全利卿; born January 6, 1976, in Okcheon, Chungcheongbuk-do) is a retired South Korean short track speed skater. She is a four-time Olympic Champion and three-time Overall World Champion for 1995–1997. She was a dominant force in International Short Track Speed Skating during the mid-1990s.

Chun took part in the 1992 Winter Olympics in Albertville, France, at the age of 15, but failed to win much attention. In 1994, however, Chun won two gold medals at the Lillehammer Winter Olympic Games. She won the women's 1000 m final, defeating the reigning World Champion Nathalie Lambert and former World Champion Kim So-hee, and was part of the team that won the 3000 m relay in a world record time along with Kim.

Between 1994 and 1998 Winter Olympics, Chun won the Overall World Championship three times in a row, in 1995, 1996 and 1997 (becoming the second person to have won three consecutive Overall World Championships).  She shared the 1997 title though with Yang Yang (A), her most significant career rival.   She also won the Overall World Cup title for 1997–1998 season.

In 1998, at the Nagano Winter Olympics, Chun successfully defended both of her Olympic titles, by defeating China's Yang Yang (A) and Yang Yang (S) in the 1000 m final after trailing for most of the race.   Yang Yang (A) crossed the line together with Chun in what was ruled and reviewed as a photo finish, but was then disqualified for cross tracking Chun at the very end as Chun tried to pass on the inside (although the photo finish seemed to show Chun having defeated her for the gold regardless). She led the relay team to another Olympic victory with world record time, completing the first "double-double" in Olympic short track history.   She also added a 5th Olympic medal, a surprising bronze in the 500 metres, her weakest event and which she had never won a World Championship medal in.   She was advanced to the bronze after winning the B final, due to a major fall in the A final leading to the disqualification of Isabelle Charest, and the refusal to finish of Wang Chunlu.   She became the first quadruple Olympic Champion in Short Track Speed Skating and the first one from Korea.  One month later at the 1998 World Championships, her final major international meet, Chun won 4 medals including her 3rd title at 3000 metres, but was still narrowly denied a 4th consecutive Overall World Championship by Yang Yang (A) (the 2nd of Yang Yang (A)'s own 6 consecutive titles, after having tied Chun for the 97 title).  The key event to the final overall result was the 1000 metres, where just as in Nagano Chun and Yang Yang (A) crossed in a virtual dead heat over the distance, but this time with Yang emerging the victor and getting the crucial 1st place points to the overall title with it.   This provided the final chapter to the intense rivalry of the 2 all-time greats, as Chun would retire immediately after the meet.

In 2002, Chun was elected to the Athletes' Committee of the International Olympic Committee.

References

1976 births
Living people
South Korean female short track speed skaters
Olympic short track speed skaters of South Korea
Olympic gold medalists for South Korea
Olympic bronze medalists for South Korea
Olympic medalists in short track speed skating
Short track speed skaters at the 1992 Winter Olympics
Short track speed skaters at the 1994 Winter Olympics
Short track speed skaters at the 1998 Winter Olympics
Medalists at the 1998 Winter Olympics
Medalists at the 1994 Winter Olympics
Asian Games medalists in short track speed skating
Asian Games gold medalists for South Korea
Asian Games silver medalists for South Korea
Asian Games bronze medalists for South Korea
Short track speed skaters at the 1990 Asian Winter Games
Short track speed skaters at the 1996 Asian Winter Games
Medalists at the 1990 Asian Winter Games
Medalists at the 1996 Asian Winter Games
Sportspeople from North Chungcheong Province
Yonsei University alumni
South Korean female speed skaters
Universiade medalists in short track speed skating
Universiade bronze medalists for South Korea
Competitors at the 1997 Winter Universiade